West Attica is one of the regional units of Greece. It is part of the region of Attica. The regional unit covers the western part of the agglomeration of Athens, and the area to its west.

Administration

The regional unit West Attica is subdivided into 5 municipalities. These are (number as in the map in the infobox):

 Aspropyrgos (2)
 Elefsina (1)
 Fyli (5)
 Mandra-Eidyllia (3)
 Megara (4)

With respect to parliamentary elections West Attica belongs to the electoral district of Attica.

Prefecture

As a part of the 2011 Kallikratis government reform, the regional unit West Attica was created out of the former prefecture West Attica. The prefecture had the same territory as the present regional unit. At the same time, the municipalities were reorganised, according to the table below.

Provinces
There were two provinces in the prefecture of West Attica: Megarida, and the Attica Province (most of which was part of East Attica). They were abolished in 2006.

See also
 List of settlements in Attica

References

External links
 Official website (in Greek only)
 News and information

 
Regional units of Attica
Prefectures of Greece